The Tippmann 98 Custom, also called the 98C, 98 Custom, and simply the 98, is an open-bolt inline blowback marker designed especially for the sport of paintball. It is manufactured by the pneumatics company Tippmann. It is their most sold marker to date.

Features and specifications
 Semi Automatic

References

External links
 Tippmann 98 Custom Official Site

Paintball markers